Upendra Kumar (18 July 1941 – 24 January 2002) was an Indian composer who predominantly worked in Kannada and Odia films. He was known for his strong association with Rajkumar and his family and scored some of his career best compositions for the films featuring Rajkumar and his sons. He had scored for 210 films including Tamil, Telugu, Malayalam and Tulu films.

Early life 
Kumar originally hailed from Digapahandi, a town in the present-day Odisha State of India. He was born in 1941 in Madras (now Chennai) in British India to a Telugu-speaking brahmin family. His father, Lakshman Swamy was an astrologer. Kumar studied up to seventh Grade and shifted towards music learning with the help of his uncle, Apparao. He underwent rigorous training in Hindustani classical, Western instrumental and Indian string instruments. He graduated with a bachelor's degree in Indian classical music, Odia music and sitar from the Uthkala College of Music and Dance. Upon completion of his graduation, he left for Madras looking for opportunities.

Career 

Once in Madras, Kumar took music classes in vocals and the sitar. An impressed film director Y. R. Swamy, with his "teaching methodology and his flair for music", signed him to score for his 1966 film Katari Veera, which had Rajkumar playing the lead role. Two tracks from the soundtrack album, "Chengu Chengendu Haaruva" and "Haayaada Ee Sangama" became popular.

As a composer, Kumar blended Odia folk music in Kannada film soundtrack. Songs from films for which he scored that became popular included Sipayi Ramu (1972), Premada Kanike (1976), Shankar Guru (1978), Dharmasere (1979), Ravichandra (1980), Kaamana Billu (1983), Ratha Sapthami (1986), Nanjundi Kalyana (1989), Hrudaya Haadithu (1991) and Jeevana Chaitra (1992). Kumar frequently collaborated with Rajkumar who playback-sung many songs for films that mostly starred himself, and picturised on him. Popular numbers of this combination included "Chinna Baalalli", "Love Me or Hate Me" and "Cheluveya Nota Chenna" from Shankar Guru, "Idhu Rama Mandira" from Ravichandra, "Indu Aananda" from Kaamana Billu, "Lakshmi Baaramma" and "Manavanaagi Huttidamele" from Jeevana Chaitra, "Naliyuthaa" from Hrudaya Haadithu and "Saptapadi Idu Saptapadi" from Saptapadi (1992). Other collaborations included with singers C. Aswath ("Negilahidida" from Kaamana Billu), Manjula Gururaj ("Olage Seridare Gundu" from Nanjundi Kalyana) and S. P. Balasubrahmanyam, who also sang many non-film devotional songs composed by Kumar. "Naadamaya" from Jeevana Chaitra fetched Rajkumar the National Film Award for Best Male Playback Singer. Lyrics for most tracks of the Upendra Kumar–Rajkumar combination were written by Chi. Udayashankar.

The mandolin and the sitar were prominently used in Kumar's instrumentation, and he was particularly fond of Kafi raga with melodies deriving from that scale. "Idu Yaaru Bareda Katheyo" from Premada Kanike was based on this raga.

Kumar won the Karnataka State Film Award for Best Music Director three times (for Nanjundi Kalyana, Hrudaya Haadithu and Jeevana Chaitra) before stopped composing for films in the mid- to late-1990s. His health deteriorated during this time and died in 2002 with the Kannada film Vishwamithra (2001) being his last work. Srikanth Srinivasa of Deccan Herald, in a tribute, wrote of Kumar's last days, "With the advent of new wave music director, Upendra Kumar was relegated to the background and found himself out of work and forgotten by the Kannada film industry. Besides, he has scored music for Dharma Devathe which was released recently. He has also scored music for Dr Rajkumar's private devotional albums."

Work in Odia films 
Alongside Kannada, Kumar notably worked also in Odia films and scored for more than 25 films. They included Dharitri (1972), Mana Akasha (1974), Punarmilana (1977),"Kavi Samrat Upendra Bhanja"(1978) and Alibha Daga (1980). His music became very popular in Odisha. A book titled Sajala Smruti was released in 2009 in memory of Kumar's work in Odia films.

Personal life 
Kumar was married to H. P. Geetha, sister of Kannada film actress H. P. Saroja.

Death
Upendra Kumar died on 24 January 2002 of jaundice in Bangalore, aged 60.

Awards
1990 – Karnataka State Film Award for Best Music Director – Nanjundi Kalyana
1992 – Karnataka State Film Award for Best Music Director – Hrudaya Haadithu
1993 – Karnataka State Film Award for Best Music Director – Jeevana Chaitra

Discography

Kannada

Odia
 Manika 
 Kabi Samrat Upendra Bhanja 
 Samarpana 
 Pipasha 
 Kula Chandrama 
 Ae Nuhen Kahani 
 Mana Akasha
 Dharithri
 Alibha Daga
 Parivara
 Palataka
 Pati Patni
 Punar Milana

See also
Rajkumar
G. K. Venkatesh
Vijaya Bhaskar
M. Ranga Rao
Manjula Gururaj

References

External links
 

1941 births
2002 deaths
Kannada film score composers
People from Odisha
20th-century Indian musicians